A Walk in the Clouds is a 1995 period romantic drama film directed by Alfonso Arau and starring Keanu Reeves, Aitana Sánchez-Gijón, Giancarlo Giannini, Angélica Aragón, Evangelina Elizondo, Debra Messing and Anthony Quinn. An American-Mexican co-production, the film is an English-language remake of the 1942 Italian film Four Steps in the Clouds.

A Walk in the Clouds was released in theaters on August 11, 1995, by 20th Century Fox. It received mixed reviews from critics, but it was a commercial success, grossing $91 million against a $20 million budget. Maurice Jarre’s musical score earned him a Golden Globe Award for Best Original Score.

Plot
In 1945, after World War II, United States Army Sgt. Paul Sutton returns to San Francisco to reunite with his wife, Betty, whom he married, following a whirlwind courtship, the day before he departed for the Pacific. The war has left him with emotional scars, and he experiences flashbacks on a regular basis.

Paul's reunion with Betty is strained, especially after he discovers that, although he has written her “almost every day,” she stopped reading his letters after the first few, and keeps the hundreds of unopened envelopes in a footlocker. He is determined to make a go of the marriage, however, and hopes to establish a new career for himself. She insists he continue to sell chocolates door-to-door, and he sets off to Sacramento. En route, he meets fellow train passenger Victoria Aragon, a graduate student whose Mexican-American family owns a vineyard in the Napa Valley. When Victoria is accosted by two men on their bus to Sacramento, Paul intervenes and ends up beating up the men in self-defense. After all three men are kicked off the bus as a result, Paul finds a crying Victoria alone, further down the road. When he learns she is pregnant by her professor, Paul offers to introduce himself to her very traditionalist family as her husband.

Victoria's father, Alberto, is infuriated, not only that she married a man below her social standing, but without his permission as well. Paul's initial plan to quietly slip away and continue on his journey, leaving her family to believe he abandoned her, is derailed when her grandfather, Don Pedro, encourages him to stay and help with the harvest. During the harvest, Paul (an orphan) grows closer to the family and learns the joys that come with their tradition, roots, and way of life. He and Victoria try to ignore their growing attraction and feelings for each other, but with little success. After a couple of days together, she finds the courage to ultimately come clean and reveal the truth to her family, further angering her father.

Paul’s honor prompts him to attempt to salvage his marriage and return home, but when he does he discovers Betty is involved with another man. She has applied for an annulment, to which he happily agrees, and he returns to the Aragon estate to ask Victoria to marry him.

When Paul returns, an argument with an angry and drunk Alberto leads to a disastrous fire which destroys the vineyard. However, Paul remembers one plant that may still have its roots intact, races off to retrieve it, and carries it to the family. The disaster, as well as Paul's bravery and dedication during it, has led to Alberto realizing his errors, and accepting Paul as one of his own, saying the roots of the plant are now officially Paul’s “roots.”  Victoria and Paul seal their fate in the presence of the entire Aragon family, and all set out to replant and rebuild with the help of their newest member.

Cast

Production

Screenplay
The screenplay for the film was written by Robert Mark Kamen, Mark Miller, and Harvey Weitzman. It was based on the 1942 Italian film Four Steps in the Clouds, written by Piero Tellini, Cesare Zavattini, and Vittorio de Benedetti. The film had a budget of $20 million.

Filming
Principal photography took place on location among the wineries of Napa Valley and in the towns of Napa, St. Helena, and Sonoma. The Napa wineries included Mayacamas Vineyards and Mount Veeder Winery. The St. Helena wineries included Beringer Vineyards, the Redwood Cellar of the Charles Krug Winery, and the Duckhorn Vineyards. In Sonoma, the Haywood Vineyards was also used.

Additional filming outside the Napa Valley region took place in San Pedro, the harbor to the south of Los Angeles. The wine festival scene was actually staged in the Large Courtyard of Pasadena City Hall in Pasadena, east of Los Angeles.

 Alverno High School, 200 North Michillinda Avenue, Sierra Madre, California, USA
 Beringer Vineyards, 2000 Main Street, St. Helena, Napa Valley, California, USA
 City Hall, 100 N. Garfield Avenue, Pasadena, California, USA
 Duckhorn Vineyards, 1000 Lodi Lane, St. Helena, Napa Valley, California, USA
 Haywood Vineyards, 18000 Old Winery Road, Sonoma, California, USA
 Mayacamas Vineyards, 1155 Lokoya Road, Napa, Napa Valley, California, USA
 Mount Veeder Winery, 1999 Mount Veeder Road, Napa, Napa Valley, California, USA
 Redwood Cellar, Charles Krug Winery, 2800 Main Street, St. Helena, Napa Valley, California, USA
 San Pedro, Los Angeles, California, USA

Soundtrack

The film score was written by Maurice Jarre, but included four songs by other composers:
 "Crush the Grapes" (Alfonso Arau and Leo Brouwer) performed by Roberto Huerta, Juan Jiménez, Febronio Covarrubias, and Ismael Gallegos
 "Beer Barrel Polka" (Wladimir A. Timm, Jaromir Vejvoda, and Lew Brown)
 "Canción mixteca" (José López Alavés) performed by Ismael Gallegos
 "Mariachi's Serenade" (Alfonso Arau and Leo Brouwer) performed by Roberto Huerta, Juan Jiménez, Febronio Covarrubias, and Ismael Gallegos

Release and critical reception

Box office
The film grossed $50,008,143 in the United States and Canada and $91 million worldwide.

Critical reception
Roger Ebert of the Chicago Sun-Times gave the film four out of four stars, his highest rating, writing:

Mick LaSalle of the San Francisco Chronicle wrote:

On the other hand, Hal Hinson of The Washington Post called it "a phenomenally atrocious movie—so bad, in fact, that you might actually manage to squeeze a few laughs out of it...The film has the syrupy, Kodak magic-moment look of a Bo Derek movie, and pretty much the same level of substance."

Variety described the film as "a glossy, fairy-tale romance that's longer on wishfulness than believability" and "a modest but sharply-mounted comedy/melodrama."

As of January 2022, A Walk in the Clouds holds a rating of 46% on Rotten Tomatoes from 28 reviews with the consensus: "A Walk in the Clouds aims for sweeping period romance, but quickly unravels thanks to a miscast leading man and a story that relies on cheap melodrama."

Awards and nominations
Maurice Jarre won the Golden Globe Award for Best Original Score. Conversely, Reeves's performance in the film earned him a Golden Raspberry Award nomination for Worst Actor (also for JM), but lost to Pauly Shore for Jury Duty.

Sexual harassment allegation
In recent interviews Debra Messing claimed she was tricked into signing a nudity waiver after being assured by the producers that no nudity scenes would be required because it was going to be a PG-13 movie, they couldn't show them anyway, nothing was going to happen and the director just had a big ego. She only learned on set that for the international release version those scenes nevertheless would be filmed. Asking the director about what angles would be shot since she wanted to be prepared, he told her that as an actress she had no right to ask about his shots and it was her job to get naked. Debra described this experience as sexual harassment which she only realized afterward since she thought it was part of the business at the time.

References

External links
 
 
 

1990s American films
1990s English-language films
1995 films
1995 romantic drama films
20th Century Fox films
American remakes of Italian films
American romantic drama films
Films about interclass romance
Films about veterans
Films about wine
Films scored by Maurice Jarre
Films directed by Alfonso Arau
Films set in California
Films set in the 1940s
Films shot in California
Films shot in North Carolina
Films with screenplays by Robert Mark Kamen
Films about Mexican Americans
Films based on Four Steps in the Clouds
English-language romantic drama films